Antalya gas power plant is a gas-fired power station in Antalya Province south-western Turkey. Average annual generation is around 5 TWh.

References

External links 

 

Natural gas-fired power stations in Turkey
Buildings and structures in İzmir Province